Films produced in Spain in the 2020s ordered by year of release on separate pages:

List of films by year
Spanish films of 2020
Spanish films of 2021
Spanish films of 2022
Spanish films of 2023
Spanish films of 2024
Spanish films of 2025
Spanish films of 2026
Spanish films of 2027
Spanish films of 2028
Spanish films of 2029

Spanish
2020s